Hemsworth Colliery Football Club were a football club based in Hemsworth, West Yorkshire, England. The team played in the Sheffield and District Football League and Alliance. Formed as Hemsworth Association Football Club in 1890 the club were later to become affiliated with the colliery and changed their name to Hemsworth Colliery.

Foundation
In April 1878 Mr J. Broughton, secretary of the Hemsworth Athletic Festival, advertised for two football clubs to play a friendly at the festival. At the town annual feast and sports event, in May 1880, a team known simply as Hemsworth played in a fixture versus a team known only as Normanton. The prizes at the festival were handed out by Mr W. H. Leatham Esq, the local Member of Parliament. The annual feast of 1881 saw Hemsworth take on Leeds Rovers and in the 1882 feast the Hemsworth team played Newmillerdam. However, it is clear this football game was played under a rugby football code.

It is clear that the association football code began to gain popularity in the town by the late 1880s, regardless of the long standing of the Hemsworth football club playing a rugby code of the game. In November 1887 the secretary of a football club known as St. Helen's placed an advert in the Sheffield Daily Telegraph for association football teams to come forward to play them in friendlies. In September 1890 a Hemsworth Association Football Club appealed in the Sheffield Daily Telegraph for football clubs from neighbouring towns and villages to contact their secretary, Mr F. G. Leatham of Hemsworth Hall, to arrange games for the following season.

Founder members of the Sheffield and District Alliance
It appears that by 1892 an association football club known as Hemsworth were founder members of the Sheffield and District Football League and Alliance (competing in the Sheffield and District Alliance league), with opponents including Barnsley St. Peter's. This club also competed in the Barnsley Senior Cup for the first time in the 1891–92 season. It appears that by 1894 association football had gained a dedicated following in the town, with the Yorkshire Post forced to reply to a letter from a reader demanding to know where the newspaper printed association football results from the town. It is not known for certain where the Hemsworth team played but it seems logical that the team playing association football would have utilised the same pitch as the Hemsworth team playing rugby football. It would also make sense for the team to have close ties to the local colliery sports facilities and in 1896 the Fitzwilliam Hemsworth Colliery Company advertised an athletic festival to be held at their Kinsley Recreation Ground. The colliery clearly placed some importance in the promotion of sports locally, as proven by their use of Fattorini and Sons of Bradford (makers of the FA Cup trophy) to supply prizes for their athletic festival.

At the turn of the century the club was competing in the Sheffield Association League, as well as in a number of Barnsley Association cup and league competitions including the Minor Cup and the Beckett Hospital Cup. The standing of the club had sufficiently raised that by the 1902–03 season they were competing in the FA Cup.

A turbulent end
In February 1903 fans of the club brought the wrath of the Sheffield and Hallamshire Football Association, due to their "misconduct". The 1902–03 season was a disaster for the club, as they finished bottom of the Sheffield Association League and subsequently left the competition at the end of the season. The club carried on for two more seasons in the Barnsley Association Minor Cup League Division One but seemingly disappeared from existence at the end of the end of the 1904–05 season. The odd thing regarding the disappearance of the club is the coincidence of the timing of the formation of the Hemsworth and District Football League and its associated cup competitions, which the club did not enter.

One probable major contributor to the downfall of the football club at this point is the part of the Kinsley Evictions. Fitzwilliam Hemsworth Colliery Company owned many of the houses in Hemsworth and outlying villages such as Kinsley and disputes between the colliery company and its workforce were common. The Kinsley Evictions saw many families who found themselves in dispute with the colliery company and living in houses owned by them evicted and homeless. Few can blame the men working at the colliery for turning their back on the colliery football team when the disputes had reached such an incredibly bitter conclusion.

Rebirths
As early as 1913 a colliery sports club known as the Hemsworth Collieries Athletic Club was in existence, though primarily focussed on athletics, cycling, cricket, billiards and bowls. The club was based at Fitzwilliam Cricket Ground and it seems that no football results or league memberships for this club are known, yet in 1919 Joe Marsh, of this club, was given a trial by Hull City. Marsh, an inside forward from South Kirkby, signed for Hull in December.

By the 1920s Hemsworth West End had risen to prominence as the senior football club in the town, reaching the FA Cup fourth qualifying round in the 1925–26 season. Yet in 1926, whilst the West End club were at their peak, a new colliery club was established. Hemsworth Main Colliery Club were formed in the 1925–26 season and in January 1926 the club agreed to step into the position of Harwood Main, who had withdrawn from the Doncaster Senior League.

In 1981, following the folding of the then existing colliery club in 1980, a new club known as Hemsworth Miners Welfare were formed.

Football ground
The Kinsley Recreation Ground was described in 1894 as being "a very fair one" and included an athletics running track which was four miles to lap.

Records
 Furthest FA Cup run – 2nd qualifying round, 1902–03.

References

Defunct football clubs in West Yorkshire
Football clubs in England
Sheffield Association League
Doncaster & District Senior League
Defunct football clubs in England
Hemsworth
Mining association football teams in England
Association football clubs established in 1890
1890 establishments in England